REACT or React may refer to:

Science and technology
REACT (telescope), a telescope at Fenton Hill Observatory, New Mexico, US

Computing
 React (JavaScript library) , a JavaScript library for building user interfaces, from Facebook 
 React Native, a mobile application framework created by Facebook
 ReactOS, an open-source operating system compatible with Microsoft Windows

Arts and entertainment
 React (book), originally Reacciona, a 2011 Spanish-language book
 React (media franchise), a metaseries of web videos created by the Fine Brothers
 React to That, a Nickelodeon TV series based on the first two React series

Music
 React (band), a 1990s American boys band made of Tim Cruz and Daniel Matrium
 React Music Limited, a 1990s London based dance record label

Albums and songs
 React (The Fixx album), a 1987 live album by the band The Fixx 
 React (Erick Sermon album), a 2002 album by rapper Erick Sermon
 "React" (Erick Sermon song), a song from the album
 React (Robert Rich and Ian Boddy album), a 2008 album by electronic musicians Robert Rich and Ian Boddy
 "React" (Onyx song), a song by Onyx on their 1998 album Shut 'Em Down
 "React" (The Pussycat Dolls song), a 2020 song by the Pussycat Dolls

Organizations
 Radio Emergency Associated Communication Teams, a volunteer radio emergency service across the US and Canada
 Rapid Enforcement Allied Computer Team, a task force of the High Technology Theft Apprehension and Prosecution Program, California, US

Other uses
 Rapid Execution and Combat Targeting System, the command and control system of the US for nuclear intercontinental ballistic missiles
 Remote Electronically Activated Control Technology belt (REACT belt), a restraint device

See also
 Reaction (disambiguation)